Gare Mahdia is a railway station in Mahdia, Tunisia, forming the southern terminus of the electrified, metre-gauge Sahel Metro line.

Trains from the station run north to Monastir and Sousse. The first station reached is Mahdia Ezzahra.

References 

Railway stations in Tunisia

Buildings and structures in Mahdia